Shamsiddin Khudoyberdiyev (born February 8, 1966, in Urgut, Samarqand, Uzbekistan) is an Uzbek wrestler who competed in the Greco-Roman 52 kg event at the 1996 Summer Olympics and finished 16th.

External links 
 profile

1966 births
Living people
People from Samarqand Region
Olympic wrestlers of Uzbekistan
Wrestlers at the 1996 Summer Olympics
Uzbekistani male sport wrestlers
Asian Games medalists in wrestling
Wrestlers at the 1994 Asian Games
Asian Games bronze medalists for Uzbekistan
Medalists at the 1994 Asian Games